Boxoffice International Pictures, Inc. was a film distributor founded in 1950. The company was owned by Harry Novak, who later used the alternate name Harry Novak Productions. It ceased operations in 1977.

Films

References

Notes 
1.Titles listed in common English title.
2.Directors listed with given names, ignoring pseudonyms and misspelled credits.

Mass media companies established in 1950
Companies disestablished in 1977
Defunct American film studios